Peace River Bridge may refer to any of the following bridges over the Peace River in Canada:

Peace River Bridge (British Columbia), Taylor, British Columbia
Peace River Suspension Bridge, Taylor, British Columbia (collapsed in 1957)
Dunvegan Suspension Bridge, in Dunvegan, Alberta
Hudson's Hope Suspension Bridge, Hudson's Hope, British Columbia

See also
Peace Bridge (Calgary), a pedestrian bridge over the Bow River in Calgary, Alberta, Canada